Lisa Anne Munday (born 14 June 1968) is an Australian politician. She has been a Labor member of the Western Australian Legislative Assembly since the 2021 state election, representing Dawesville.

Prior to entering politics Munday worked as a paramedic and registered psychologist.

In July 2020 she was selected to contest the seat for Labor, after being approached by the Ambulance Union and WA Labor. In her election campaign Munday received mentoring from Federal politician, Ged Kearney, through EMILY's List Australia. She defeated Opposition Leader Zak Kirkup on a swing of over 14 percent, taking 63.9 percent of the two-party vote and turning a seat that Labor had never previously won into a safe Labor seat in one stroke. She actually won 57 percent of the primary vote, enough to win the seat without the need for preferences.

References

External links 

 

Living people
1968 births 
Australian Labor Party members of the Parliament of Western Australia
Members of the Western Australian Legislative Assembly
Western Australian local councillors
Women members of the Western Australian Legislative Assembly
21st-century Australian politicians
21st-century Australian women politicians
Women local councillors in Australia